Mahseer is the common name used for the genera Tor, Neolissochilus, Naziritor and Parator in the family Cyprinidae (carps). The name is, however, more often restricted to members of the genus Tor. The range of these fish is from Vietnam in the east and China in the north, through Laos, Cambodia, Thailand, Malaysia, Brunei and Indonesia, and across southern Asia including the countries of India, Nepal, Bhutan and Bangladesh within the Indian Peninsula, plus Sri Lanka, Pakistan and Afghanistan. They are commercially important game fish, as well as highly esteemed food fish. Mahseer fetch high market price, and are potential candidate species for aquaculture. Several of the larger species have suffered severe declines, and are now considered threatened due to pollution, habitat loss, overfishing and increasing concern about the impacts of unregulated release of artificially bred stock of a very limited number of species.

The taxonomy of the mahseers is confusing due to the morphological variations they exhibit. In developing strategies for aquaculture and propagation assisted rehabilitation of mahseer species, resolution of taxonomic ambiguities is needed  and adherence to IUCN stocking guidelines  must be followed.

Mahseers inhabit both rivers and lakes, with some species believed to ascend into rapid streams with rocky bottoms for breeding. Like other types of carps, they are omnivorous, eating not only algae, crustaceans, insects, frogs, and other fish, but also fruits that fall from trees overhead.

The first species from this group were scientifically described by Francis Buchanan-Hamilton in 1822, and first mentioned as an angling challenge by the Oriental Sporting Magazine in 1833, soon becoming a favorite quarry of British anglers living in India.
 

Currently, the largest of the mahseer is Tor remadevii, which is known to grow to in excess of 120lb. In 2011, UK angler Ken Loughran landed a fish that was too heavy for the 120lb scales being used. This fish was claimed as a 'World record' at 130lb 10oz, although the weighing process used is in doubt.
In addition to being caught for sport, mahseer are also part of commercial fishing and ornamental or aquarium fish.

Etymology
The Hindi and Kumaoni name of mahāsir, mahāser, or mahāsaulā is used for a number of fishes of the group. Several sources of the common name mahseer have been suggested: It has been said to be derived from Sanskrit, while others claim it is derived from Indo-Persian, mahi- fish and sher- tiger or "tiger among fish" in Persian. Alternatively, mahā-śalka, meaning large-scaled, is suggested, as the scales are so large that Francis Buchanan mentions that playing cards were made from them at Dacca. Another theory by Henry Sullivan Thomas suggests mahā-āsya: great mouth. The name mahasher is commonly used in Urdu, Punjabi, and Kashmiri languages in Pakistan for this fish and is said to be made up of two local words: maha = big and sher = lion, as it ascends in the hilly rivers and streams of Himalaya courageously. Sadhale and Nene translate the Sanskrit word mahashila, as used in some texts  as "stone-like", interpreting that to mean a powerful fish.

Mahseers in Indonesia possess a multitude of names owing to the multiethnic composition of the country; in Java, they are referred to as ikan dewa; literally God-Fish or Fish of the Gods.

Species

Sen and Jayaram restrict the term mahseer to members of the genus Tor. However, the species of genus Neolissochilus and the genera Naziritor and Parator are also called mahseers due to their large-sized scales and other similarities.
Scientists now try to use the terms 'true mahseer' for species within Tor, and 'lesser mahseers' for species within Neolissochilus, Naziritor and Parator.

Genus Tor
The genus Tor includes:

 Tor ater, Roberts, 1999
 Tor barakae, Arunkumar & Basudha, 2003, Barakae mahseer
 Tor douronensis, Valenciennes, 1842, Semah mahseer or river carp. Synonymous with Tor tambra
 Tor hemispinus, Chen & Chu, 1985
 Tor kulkarnii, Menon, 1992, dwarf mahseer, uncertain as only one specimen found till now
 Tor khudree, Sykes, 1839, black mahseer, Deccan mahseer, or blue-finned mahseer
 Tor laterivittatus, Zhou & Cui, 1996
 Tor macrolepis, Heckel, 1838, uncertain species
 Tor malabaricus, Jerdon, 1849, Malabar mahseer
 Tor mosal, Hamilton, 1822, copper mahseer
 Tor mussullah, Sykes, 1839, erroneously  called humpback mahseer
 Tor polylepis, Zhou & Cui, 1996
 Tor progeneius, McClelland, 1839, Jungha mahseer
 Tor putitora, Hamilton, 1822, Himalayan mahseer or golden mahseer
 Tor qiaojiensis, Wu, 1977
 Tor remadevii, Madhusoodana & Radhakrishnan, 2007, orange-finned mahseer or hump-backed mahseer
 Tor sinensis, Wu, 1977,  Chinese mahseer
 Tor soro, Valenciennes, 1842 now reassigned to Neolissochilus soroides
 Tor streeteri, Myers, 1927
 Tor tambra, Valenciennes, 1842, Javan mahseer, red mahseer (ikan kelah merah)
 Tor tambroides, Bleeker, 1854, Malayan mahsheer (erroneous), Sumatran mahseer
 Tor tor, Hamilton, 1822, red-finned mahseer, short-gilled mahseer, or deep-bodied mahseer
 Tor yingjiangensis, Chen & Yang, 2004
 Tor yunnanensis, (Wang, Zhuang & Gao, 1982)

Genus Neolissochilus
The genus Neolissochilus includes:

 Neolissochilus baoshanensis, (Chen & Yang, 1999)
 Neolissochilus benasi, (Pellegrin & Chevey, 1936)
 Neolissochilus blythii, (Day, 1870)
 Neolissochilus compressus, (Day, 1870)
 Neolissochilus dukai, (Day, 1878)
 Neolissochilus hendersoni, (Herre, 1940)
 Neolissochilus heterostomus, (Chen & Yang, 1999)
 Neolissochilus hexagonolepis, (McClelland, 1839), chocolate mahseer
 Neolissochilus hexastichus, (McClelland, 1839), brown mahseer
 Neolissochilus longipinnis, (Weber & de Beaufort, 1916)
 Neolissochilus namlenensis, (Nguyen & Doan, 1969) 
 Neolissochilus nigrovittatus, (Boulenger, 1893)
 Neolissochilus paucisquamatus, (Smith, 1945)
 Neolissochilus pnar (Dahanukar, Sundar, Rangad, Proudlove & Raghavan, 2023)
 Neolissochilus soroides, (Duncker, 1904)
 Neolissochilus spinulosus, (McClelland, 1845)
 Neolissochilus stevensonii, (Day, 1870)
 Neolissochilus stracheyi, (Day, 1871), blue mahseer
 Neolissochilus subterraneus, Vidthayanon & Kottelat, 2003
 Neolissochilus sumatranus, (Weber & de Beaufort, 1916)
 Neolissochilus theinemanni, (Ahl, 1933)
 Neolissochilus tweediei, (Herre & Myers, 1937) junior synonym of Neolissochilus soroides
 Neolissochilus vittatus, (Smith, 1945)
 Neolissochilus wynaadensis, (Day, 1873), copper mahseer

Genus Naziritor
The genus Naziritor includes:

 Naziritor zhobensis, Mirza, 1967, Balochi mahseer
Naziritor chelynoides, McClelland, 1839, Dark mahseer

Genus Parator
The genus Parator includes: one single species

 Parator zonatus, Lin, 1935, Tri-lobed lip barbel

Historical references
Researchers working at sites from the Harappan era or Indus Valley civilisation, found collections of pottery decorated with fish motifs as well as fish bones left in midden pits. Hora  describes his interpretation of each of the species depicted on the painted pots, which include most of the species common today in the Indus basin, including mahseer. During his work on the remains of fish bones, renowned ethnoarchaeologist Dr William R. Belcher  discovered that while fish, including large species like Indian major carps and various catfish, comprised a substantial element of the diets of this 3300–1300 BCE civilisation, bones of mahseer were extremely rare. It has been suggested  that this is the first known instance of mahseer being ‘revered’ or singled out from other fish species as ‘God's fish’.

During the later period of the Chalukya dynasty, under the Western Chalukya Empire, King Someshvara III describes fishing in the rivers and seas around his kingdom, which include many areas that are inhabited by the mahseer species Tor remadevii, Tor malabaricus and Tor khudree. The king includes "mahashila", a "large river fish(es) of the scaly type." He then goes on to describe the best methods of Angling for the various fish species to be encountered in his kingdom, including how to prepare baits for each. There is a further description of how to prepare the fish for cooking and eating.

Many of the most detailed descriptions of mahseer begin to appear during the British colonisation of India, in particular, during the British Raj of 1857 to 1947. Many of those stationed in India enjoyed angling for mahseer, which they compared to the thrill of catching a salmon ‘back home’. Indeed, Henry Sullivan Thomas, author of one of the first books on angling in the colonies  said "the mahseer shows more sport for its size than a salmon." They also produced guidebooks and penned letters to sporting journals such as The Field and Fishing Gazette.

H.S. Thomas also gives a description of south Indian followers of Hinduism equating mahseer with Matsya, one of the incarnations of the god Vishnu and responsible for saving Manu from the flood. This tale is common in many of the classic Hindu texts, with the first reference being in the Shatapatha Brahmana, part of the Vedas body of works dated from 1500 to 400 BCE.

In heraldry (and other official representations)

Mahseer was an important symbol in the heraldry of certain Muslim-ruled former princely states of the Subcontinent such as Baoni, Bhopal, Kurwai and Rampur. Dost Mohammad Khan's son Yar Mohammad received from Nizam-ul-Mulk the insignia of the Maha Muratib (the dignity of the Fish). The insignia became part of the Bhopal State's coat of arms.

The Mahseer fish as an emblem of the highest honour in royalty is allegedly from Persian origin and was adopted by the courts of Oudh and the Paigah nobles of Hyderabad State, being later passed down to other states of the area.

In India, many states have adopted mahseer as their State Fish. Arunachal Pradesh, Himachal Pradesh, Jammu and Kashmir and Uttarakhand all have the golden mahseer, Nagaland has the 'Chocolate mahseer', Neolissochilus hexagonolepis as their State Fish, Odisha has the fish known as 'Mahanadi mahseer', Tor mosal mahanadicus as its State Fish. The southern state of Karnataka is considering changing its State Fish from Carnatic carp to the IUCN Red Listed Critically Endangered Tor remadevii.

There have been calls for Tor tambra, the 'Java mahseer' known locally as emperau, to be adopted as the national fish of Malaysia.

Conservation issues for mahseer
Translocation movements of mahseer within India have been happening since the 1850s, at least. During this period, the integrity and identity of species was poorly understood, which may have caused unintentional issues of Hybridisation between species or competition from Invasive species.

Among the best documented areas where fish movements have been used for reasons of improving angling sport, or attempting to augment declining stocks are the Lakes of Kumaon hills. The Kumaon lakes in Uttarakhand, Bhimtal Lake, Nainital Lake, Naukuchiatal Lake and Sattal Lake, were stocked with mahseer in 1858 by Sir H. Ramsey, with stock brought from the rivers Gaula and Kali. According to Walker in his 'Angling in the Kumaon Lakes', the Bhimtal stocking was less successful, until a second batch of fish were introduced in 1878.
Dr Raj, Fisheries Development Officer in United Provinces, in his 1945 report on the decline of mahseer stocks in the lakes says:
"From all reports these isolated lakes had hardly any fish in them before the introduction of mahseer."

This is clearly a misunderstanding of the history of mahseer in the lakes, as Walker earlier says:
"When I first angled in Nainital Lake, in 1863 and 1864, there were comparatively few large mahsir in it; there were shoals of the lake fish (Barbus Chilinoides) and many small trout (Barilius Bola). A morning's catch would include a couple of small mahsir, eight or nine ' lake-fish' and two or three trout. Gradually the mahsir have reduced the numbers of the other fish until it is a rare circumstance to catch a ‘lake-fish’ with the fly, and I have not for many years seen a single trout, although I heard of one being caught last year by a troller."

The inference must be that the introductions of mahseer into the lakes caused the unexpected decline of several native fish stocks, either due to competition, or by direct predation and that the earlier fish stocks were notable.

In Himachal Pradesh, golden mahseer is depleting at a fast rate from the state even though it was categorised as an endangered species by the National Bureau of Fish Genetic Resources as early as 1992.

In common with most areas within the geographic range of mahseers, the factors leading to this situation are mainly anthropogenic distortion of rivers due to the construction of river valley projects, multipurpose dams, shrinking habitat, poaching and other stock exploitation, and widespread introduction of invasive species.

Intentional stocking of mahseers in the trans-Himalayan region have been taking place for several years. It has been reported that the Teesta River in Sikkim and West Bengal has been stocked with hundreds of thousands of golden mahseer every year since at least 2014 in a drive to promote angling in the region. That the fish stocks continue to decline  suggests that the policy needs to be reviewed and more efforts devoted to improving habitat as the first priority.

Revision of all mahseer species
In May 2019, Mahseer Trust and collaborators published a major revision paper. This paper includes the latest IUCN Red Listing status and validity of 16 species of the Tor genus. Following this publication, fresh impetus into understanding the ecology of wild populations and establishing more secure species identities will allow coherent conservation programmes to be enacted, and fish currently listed Data Deficient to be accorded with relevant threat status.

Conferences
Over several decades, concerned organisations have arranged conferences to debate issues around mahseer conservation. Among the early events was the Kuala Lumpur Conference of 2005, and in 2014, WWF-India convened a forum in Delhi. Both of these events looked at many issues specific to mahseer, and typical outputs included measures to investigate greater understanding of mahseer ecology.

In 2017, Mahseer Trust convened a different kind of event, by including representatives to discuss all aspects of both the fish and the river habitat in which they live. This unique conference included sessions aired live on social media, with a final question and answer session reaching 6,000 viewers.

December 2018 saw the First International Conference, in Paro, Bhutan.
Among the many recommendations were increased research into the ecology of wild mahseer and ensuring artificial breeding of mahseer is done under strict control using IUCN guidelines.

IMC2 was held in Chiang Mai, Thailand, in February 2020.

Roundtable workshops on the final day agreed to produce outputs, including papers, white paper proposals and outreach media, in the following areas of concern: 
 What is a mahseer? Considering taxonomy.
 Value of recreational angling. Setting standards.
 Impacts of invasive species. Ways to ensure enforcement.
 Developing outreach and education. To share messages and programmes.

References

Other sources
 Nautiyal, Prakash, ed. 1994. Mahseer: The Game Fish. Natural History, Status and Conservation Practices in India and Nepal. Rachna.
 Silas, E. G., Gopalakrishnan, A., John, L., and Shaji, C. P.. 2005. Genetic identity of Tor malabaricus  (Jerdon) (Teleostei: Cyprinidae) as revealed by RAPD markers. Indian journal of fish. 52(2): 125–140.
 Rainboth, W. J. 1985. Neolissochilus, a new group of South Asia Cyprinid fishes. Beaufortia. 35(3): 25–35.
 Mirza, M. R., and Javed, M. N. 1985. A note on Mahseer of Pakistan with the description of Naziritor, a new subgenus (Pisces: Cyprinidae). Pakistan Journal of Zoology. 17: 225–227.
 Arunkumar; & Ch. Basudha. 2003. Tor barakae, a new species of mahseer fish (Cyprinidae: Cyprininae) from Manipur, India. Aquacult. 4(2): 271–276.
 Ambak, M.A., Ashraf, A.H. and Budin, S. 2007. Conservation of the Malaysian Mahseer in Nenggiri Basin through Community Action. In: Mahseer, The Biology, Culture and Conservation. Malaysian Fisheries Society Occasional Publication No.14, Kuala Lumpur 2007:217–228
National Agricultural Technology Project, 2004. Germplasm inventory, evaluation and gene banking of freshwater fishes. World Bank funded Project MM, No: 27/28/98/NATP/MM-III, 18-32p. National Bureau of Fish Genetic Resources, Lucknow India.

External links

 http://www.mahseertrust.org
 Golden Mahseer
 Mahseer information
 Deccan Mahseer
 Mahseer Research Centre – India

Fish of Asia
Cyprininae
Fish common names
Indian culture
Fish in heraldry

bn:মহাশোল
id:Semah
lt:Pailgažvyniai
ml:കുയിൽ മീൻ
ms:Ikan Kelah
ne:सहर (माछा)
pnb:معاشیر